All Saints University is a private university in Uganda.

All Saints University may also refer to:

 All Saints University School of Medicine, in Roseau, Dominica
 All Saints University College of Medicine, Saint Vincent and the Grenadines
 All Saints University of Medicine, former name of Aureus University School of Medicine, Oranjestad, Aruba

See also
 All Saints (disambiguation)
 All Saints College (disambiguation)